Agapito Lozada (1938 – 29 July 2011) was a Filipino swimmer. He competed at the 1956 Summer Olympics. He competed in the Men's 4 × 200 metres Freestyle Relay and Men's 200 metres Butterfly not making it past the heats.

References

External links
 

1938 births
2011 deaths
Filipino male swimmers
Olympic swimmers of the Philippines
Swimmers at the 1956 Summer Olympics
Asian Games medalists in swimming
Swimmers at the 1958 Asian Games
People from Parañaque
Asian Games silver medalists for the Philippines
Medalists at the 1958 Asian Games
21st-century Filipino people
20th-century Filipino people